Ahuntsic-Cartierville ( (local accent)) is a borough (arrondissement) of the city of Montreal, Quebec, Canada. The borough was created following the 2002 municipal reorganization of Montreal. It comprises two main neighbourhoods, Ahuntsic, a former village annexed to Montreal in 1910 and Cartierville, a town annexed to Montreal in 1916.

Ahuntsic-Cartierville is located in the north end of Montreal, on the banks of the Rivière des Prairies. It traces its history to the fortified Sault-au-Récollet settlement, which was established by the Sulpicians in 1696. This in turn led to the colonization of the area.

History

Sault-au-Récollet

One of the oldest villages on the island of Montreal, Sault-au-Récollet still retains its village atmosphere with many houses dating from the 18th and 19th centuries. It was the original site of Fort Lorette, a trading post and mission for the conversion of the First Nations people of the area.

It grew prosperous in the 18th century with the construction of a mill on the rapids on the Rivière des Prairies (from which the village derives its name: Sault-au-Récollet, or Recollet Falls). A dam was built on the narrow arm of the river that passes between the village and Visitation Island, which splits the river in two at that point. A museum and cultural centre, the Maison du Pressoir, perpetuates this memory. A hydroelectric dam was built later and still exists further down the river.

The village and Île de la Visitation (Visitation Island) are surrounded by the green space of the Parc-Nature de l'Île de la Visitation. The village is noted for Visitation Church, one of the oldest churches in Montreal, which is a listed historical monument.

Cartierville

Cartierville grew as a suburb when it became in 1898 the north terminus of the Montreal Park and Island Railway tramway line, also known as the "17-Cartierville". Named in the honor of Sir George-Étienne Cartier, it became a village officially in 1906. During December 1912, it achieved city status. Two years later, the rural and agricultural part of Cartierville was granted independence from the city and was then known as Ville de Saraguay.

On 22 December 1916, the provincial government ordered the annexation of Cartierville to Montreal. The district was famous for the Belmont Park amusement park which operated from 1929 to the 1980s.

Nouveau-Bordeaux

New Bordeaux (or simply Bordeaux) was originally part of the independent village of Cartierville until it became its own municipality in 1898. The district was originally named Saint-Joseph de Bordeaux until 1906. One year later, Bordeaux attained city status. On June 4, 1910, it was annexed by the larger City of Montreal. The district was home to Maurice Richard, writer Claude Jasmin and Comte Daeylar.

Ahuntsic

The municipality of the Village of Ahuntsic was founded on January 21, 1897, by a proclamation of the Quebec provincial government. The council of the new village operated until 1910, when the province passed laws creating the charter of the City of Montreal. It was then annexed and later combined with Nouveau-Bordeaux, forming the district of Ahuntsic-Bordeaux. The city of Cartierville and Sault-au-Récollet were added in 1918.

In 1952, following a land exchange, Ahuntsic took over part of Saint-Laurent. The Ahuntsic-Cartierville borough was part of the City of Montreal prior to January 1, 2002. For further reading on pre-merger Montreal, see Karen Herland's book "People, Potholes and Politics".

Saraguay
In 1914, the rural and agricultural part of the city of Cartierville became independent, forming its own city. It was only in 1964, that Saraguay joined itself to the City of Montreal under law 2926 approved by the lieutenant-governor of the province of Quebec.

Geography
The borough is located in the northern part of Montreal along the banks of the Rivière des Prairies, and includes some islands in the river such as Île aux Chats, Île Perry, and Île de la Visitation. It is bounded to the east by Montréal-Nord, to the southeast by the borough of Villeray–Saint-Michel–Parc-Extension, to the southwest by the borough of Saint-Laurent, and to the west by the borough of Pierrefonds-Roxboro. It has an area of 22.92 km² and a population of 127,000.

The boundary between Ahuntsic and Cartierville is Autoroute 15.

Politics

Municipal
The borough's office is located at 555, rue Chabanel West, Montreal. The territory is divided into four districts.

Borough council

Federal and provincial
Federally, the borough is in the riding of Ahuntsic-Cartierville. Provincially, the borough is divided between the Saint-Laurent, Acadie, and Crémazie electoral districts.

Demographics

Education
The Collège de Bois-de-Boulogne and the Collège Ahuntsic are located in Ahuntsic-Cartierville.

The Commission scolaire de Montréal (CSDM) operates French-language public schools.

Elementary 
 École Saint-Bernardin
 École Marie-Rivier
 École Sainte-Lucie
 École Saint-Antoine-Marie-Claret
 École Atelier
 École La Visitation
 École Saints-Martyrs-Canadiens
 École Saint-Simon-Apôtre
 École Saint-Isaac-Jogues
 École Fernand-Seguin
 École Christ-Roi
 École Saint-Paul-de-la-Croix
 École Louis-Colin
 École Ahuntsic
 École Saint-André-Apôtre
 École Saint-Benoît
 École Gilles-Vigneault 
 École Sainte-Odile
 École François-de-Laval 
 École Alice-Parizeau
 École Louisbourg

High school 
 École Dominique-Savio
 École Sophie-Barat
 École Evangéline
 École La Dauversière
 École Marie-Anne
The English Montreal School Board (EMSB) operates English-language schools.

Elementary 
 John Caboto Academy

High school 
 L.I.N.K.S. High School

Specialized  
 St. Pius X Career Centre

Infrastructure

Transport
Ahuntsic-Cartierville is served by three stations on the north-eastern part of the Montreal Metro's Orange line which runs underneath Berri Street. Henri-Bourassa station located on Henri Bourassa Boulevard, Sauvé station located on Sauvé Street, and Crémazie station located on Crémazie Boulevard.

The borough is also served by four commuter rail stations of the Réseau de transport métropolitain. Bois-de-Boulogne station and Chabanel station on the Saint-Jérôme line is located on Henri Bourassa Blvd, while Ahuntsic and Sauvé on the Mascouche line are near the Sauvé St. The Bois-Franc station on the Deux-Montagnes line is located on Henri Bourassa Blvd. in nearby Saint-Laurent.

Two major Autoroutes are located in the Ahuntsic-Cartierville. Autoroute15 (Laurentian Autoroute/Autoroute des Laurentides) runs north-south and Autoroute 40 (Metropolitan Autoroute/Autoroute Métropolitaine) runs east-west.

Main streets or boulevards include Henri-Bourassa, Fleury, Sauvé, L'Acadie, Chabanel, Gouin, Saint-Laurent, Saint-Denis, Salaberry.

Healthcare
Sacré-Coeur Hospital and Fleury Hospital service the area. The CLSC also responds to citizen's health care needs.

Sports and recreation
Ahuntsic-Cartierville features large parks along its riverside, such as Île Perry and Parc de l'Île de la Visitation, which offer views of the river and of nearby Laval, Quebec. Ahuntsic Park and Marcelin-Wilson Park are the borough's main parks, which both have playgrounds, skate parks, and arenas housing ice skating rinks. Ahuntsic Park has a dog park, a community garden, water playground and large open-space field for outdoor seasonal events while Marcelin-Wilson Park has a swimming pool, tennis courts and soccer fields.  The borough is also traversed by the Route Verte, a province-wide network of bicycle paths. The Complexe sportif Claude-Robillard, located at 1000 Émile-Journault Avenue, is one of the main sport complexes in the city. The Cartierville area to the west was formerly the home of the Belmont Park amusement park.

The Orioles de Montréal baseball team of the Ligue de Baseball Élite du Québec play their home games at Gary Carter Stadium (formerly Marcel-Clement Field) located in Ahuntsic Park.

The borough has three libraries of the Montreal Public Libraries Network: Ahuntsic (adults and children), Cartierville (adults and children) and De Salaberry (children's only).

See also
 Boroughs of Montreal
 Centrale de la Rivière des Prairies
 Districts of Montreal
 Municipal reorganization in Quebec

References

External links

 Borough website 

 
Boroughs of Montreal
2002 establishments in Quebec